Vedanthangal Bird Sanctuary is a  protected area located in the Madurantakam taluk of the Chengalpattu District in the state of Tamil Nadu, India. It is easily reachable from Madurantakam and Chengalpattu. More than 40,000 birds (including 26 rare species), from various parts of the world visit the sanctuary during the migratory season every year. Vedanthangal is home to migratory birds such as pintail, garganey, grey wagtail, blue-winged teal, common sandpiper and the like. It has been designated as a protected Ramsar site since 2022.

Vedanthangal is the oldest water bird sanctuary in the country. Vedanthangal in Tamil language means 'hamlet of the hunter'. This area was a favourite hunting spot of the local landlords in the early 18th century. The region attracted a variety of birds because it was dotted with small lakes that acted as feeding grounds for the birds. Realising its ornithological importance, the British government undertook steps to develop Vedanthangal into a bird sanctuary as early as 1798. This was established in 1858 by the order of the Collector of Chengalpattu.

The best time to visit this sanctuary is from November to March. During this time, birds are seen busy building and maintaining their nests.

Villagers near this sanctuary are very concerned about the sanctuary and its winged residents, and they have taken many serious steps to avoid disturbance to the flow of birds.

History

The Vedanthangal lake bird sanctuary has a tradition of the people actively protecting birds coming to the area since time immemorial. The local people understood the relationship between birds and the productivity of their crops even before the concept of wildlife conservation came into vogue. They knew that the bird droppings in the water created guano which acted as fertilizer. Towards the end of the 18th century local villagers complained to the collector of Chengalpet Lionel Palace, about the British soldiers shooting the birds. They demanded and obtained a 'Cowle' from the collector (Mr Place, Collector of Chingleput 1796-1798) to protect the birds. In 1936 the collector officially recognized the lake as a sanctuary. In 1962 it was given the legal status of reserved forest under the Madras Forest Act.

Several accounts of the sanctuary were published in the mid-19th century. In 1936, the park was notified as a sanctuary, and in 1962, the Madras Forest Act legally accorded the status of a reserve forest to Vedanthangal. Ten years later, the place was declared as a wildlife sanctuary.

In 1967, a rest house was constructed for the convenience of visiting inspecting officers and tourists.  In the government order dated 8 July 1988, the area was declared as the 'Vedanthangal Lake Bird Sanctuary', under the Wildlife Protection Act of 1972.

The area had a compact grove of more than 500 Barringtonia trees earlier.  An additional 100 trees were planted in 1973 and over 1,000 trees were planted in 1996.

Bird species

The Vedanthangal Lake Bird Sanctuary features thousands of birds coming from various countries, some of which can be easily identified. Some easily found birds include cormorants, darters, grebes, large egrets, little egrets, moorhens, night herons, paddy birds, painted storks, pintails, pond herons, sandpipers, shovellers, terns, white ibises and many more. The migratory birds include garganeys and teals from Canada; snake birds and glossy ibises from Sri Lanka; grey pelicans from Australia; grey herons and openbilled stork from Bangladesh; painted storks from Siberia; spoonbills from Burma and the Indian spot-billed duck. It is a good tourist spot.

Location

The Lake
The Vedanthangal lake is situated 122 m above sea level. It supplies water to 250 acres of agricultural land around the area. The west and south sides of the lake are bordered by a long bund, whereas the northern and eastern sides extend to the agricultural lands. Input of water into this lake is through four small canals. Maximum depth of the lake is 5 metres. The area receives an average annual rainfall of 1400 mm, mostly from the north-east monsoon. There is a  observation tower in the sanctuary.

Flora and fauna

Flora: Barringtonia acutangula, Acacia nilotica, and Alangium salviflorum trees and dry evergreen scrub and thorn forests.

Fauna: monkeys and other common mammals can be spotted.

Birds: garganey, teal, glossy ibis, grey heron, grey pelican, open-billed stork, painted stork, snake bird, spoonbill, spot bill duck, cormorants, darter, grebes, large egret, little egrets, moorhen, night herons, paddy bird, painted stork, pintails, pond heron, sandpiper, shovellers, terns, white ibis. They migrate from Europe during November and December to escape the frost that sets in.

Vedanthangal Bird Sanctuary

List of birds
The breeding waterbirds found at the Vedanthangal bird sanctuary are:
 Grey Pelican Pelecanus philippensis
 Large Cormorant Phalacrocorax carbo
 Indian Shag Phalacrocorax fuscicollis
 Little Cormorant Microcarbo niger
 Darter Anhinga rufa
 Grey Heron Ardea cinerea
 Large Egret Ardea alba
 Smaller (Median) Egret Egretta intermedia
 Little Egret Egretta garzetta
 Night Heron Nycticorax nycticorax
 Openbilled Stork Anastomus oscitans
 Black-headed Ibis Threskiornis melanocephalus
 Spoonbill Platalea leucorodia

Conservation

Several steps have been taken by the Government of Tamil Nadu to protect the area. Water channels have been built by the Public Works Department to facilitate water supply to the sanctuary from neighbouring lakes.

In 2013, two lakh Barringtonia saplings were planted in the sanctuary to allow birds to nest. The Vedanthangal lake was also desilted and deepened to hold more water.

See also
 List of birds of South India
 List of birds of Tamil Nadu

References

External links

Bird sanctuaries of Tamil Nadu
Important Bird Areas of India
Coromandel Coast
Eastern Ghats
South Deccan Plateau dry deciduous forests
Protected areas of Tamil Nadu
Protected areas established in 1936
1936 establishments in India
Ramsar sites in India